Robert Ian "Butch" Barber (August 31, 1943 - December 12, 2019) is a Canadian former professional ice hockey player.

In World Hockey Association play, Barber played 75 games with Chicago Cougars during the 1972–73 season, and 3 games with the New York Golden Blades during the 1973–74 season.

References

External links

1943 births
2019 deaths
Canadian ice hockey defencemen
Chicago Cougars players
Cleveland Barons (1937–1973) players
Houston Apollos players
Ice hockey people from Alberta
Hershey Bears players
New York Golden Blades players
Providence Reds players
Syracuse Blazers players
Syracuse Eagles players
Tidewater Sharks players